Gary Fisken (born 27 October 1981) is an English former footballer who is last known to have played as a midfielder for Sun Sports.

Career

Fisken started his career with English second tier side Watford. In 2004, Fisken signed for Swansea City in the English fourth tier, where he made 8 appearances and scored 0 goals, helping them earn promotion to the English third tier. On 27 January 2005, he debited for Swansea City during a 1-3 loss to Bury. Before the second half of 2005–06, Fisken signed for English sixth tier club Newport County. In 2013, he signed for Sun Sports in the English tenth tier.

References

External links
 

English footballers
Watford F.C. players
Swansea City A.F.C. players
Thurrock F.C. players
Newport County A.F.C. players
Expatriate footballers in Wales
Living people
Association football midfielders
1981 births
English expatriate footballers